North Ferriby is a village and civil parish in the Haltemprice area of the East Riding of Yorkshire, England.

History

Humber Estuary
"The archaeology of the intertidal wetlands of the Humber Estuary is of international importance, and includes prehistoric boats, trackways, fishtraps and platforms, Roman settlements and ports and Post-Medieval fishweirs."

The foreshore of North Ferriby, within the Humber Estuary, is the site of the earliest sewn plank boats known outside Egypt. In 1931, wooden planks belonging to an ancient boat were discovered by local man Ted Wright on the shore of the Humber. Two further boats have since been discovered. Estimates using radiocarbon dating have placed the origin of the boats to the Bronze Age, between 2030 and 1680 BC. The Ferriby Boats are the earliest known boats found in Europe. In addition, Bronze Age round barrows were found near North Ferriby by archaeologists excavating the land on which the A63 junction was built. There was also evidence of Iron Age and early Romano-British activity in that area.

The first wave of Danes arrived in the area around 900 AD with each ship setting up a local village. Amongst these was what is now North Ferriby from the Danish Ferja bi (place by a ferry), which would have been the chief Danish settlement of the area and linked by ferry to South Ferriby. A wooden church was built at that time, replaced by its first stone church .

Ferriby Priory
The village was once significant for Ferriby Priory, of the order of knights templar, founded by Lord Eustace Broomfleet de Vesci, in the reign of King John, anno 1200, as appears from an ancient manuscript formerly in the possession of the late Luke Lillingston, Esq. of North Ferriby, the Owner of the priory. It was dissolved along with the lesser monasteries, in 1536. The site of this priory is said to have been in the possession of 100 different persons "in the space of no more than 130 years after its dissolution".

The village has, in succession, been the patrimonial possession of the Mortimers, the Poles and the Bacons.

Geography
To the north, atop a hill, lies Swanland via the B1231. South Ferriby is directly opposite the village, on the south bank of the Humber. North Ferriby is generally referred to as "Ferriby" by locals on the north bank, except where confusion might arise. Melton is close by to the west which is where the large South Hunsley School is.

North Ferriby lies in the Parliamentary constituency of Haltemprice and Howden.

Community
Ferriby parish had a population of 3,893, an increase on the 2001 UK census figure of 3,819 according to the 2011 UK census.
The school has approximately 300 pupils.

In the village is the Duke of Cumberland public house, a British Legion club, an Italian restaurant, a pizza takeaway, a newsagent, chemist, estate agents, a squash club with three courts, village hall, parish hall and three hairdressers. North Ferriby's main shop is a Co-operative Group convenience store. North Ferriby was home to local artist Tom Harland.

The village Riding for Disabled Association (RDA) is run throughout the year with the help of volunteers.

The local football club, North Ferriby United A.F.C., played in the National League North. They won the 2014–15 FA Trophy after beating Conference Premier side Wrexham at Wembley Stadium on 29 March 2015. However were wound up by the High Court on 15 March 2019 due to outstanding debts of almost £10,000. A new club, North Ferriby F.C., was formed and play in the Northern Counties East League Premier Division.

There also the Anne Turner allotments and playing fields, home of North Ferriby Cricket Club. There are also three tennis courts and a newly built skate park.

A public footpath that forms part of the Trans Pennine Trail and the Yorkshire Wolds Way, runs from Ferriby to Hessle alongside the River Humber, with views of the Humber Bridge. On this path is the site where the Ferriby boats were found.

The village no longer has a police house; the nearest police stations are in Brough and Hessle.

With the backing of the Parish Council, the Twinning Association was formed in the spring of 2003 and links North Ferriby with Le Pellerin, a French village to the south of Brittany, on the estuary of France's longest river, the Loire.

The village church has a distinctive spire, designed by John Loughborough Pearson, R.A. (1817–97), and was completed in 1848. The church dedicated to All Saints' was designated a Grade II listed building in 1968 and is now recorded in the National Heritage List for England, maintained by Historic England.
The current vicar is Reverend Matthew Brailsford. The parish used to have extensive holdings, including St Mary Lowgate in Hull.

Transport
The village is served by the main A63 road, being bypassed in 1961, which links to the M62 motorway to the west and Hull to the east. The former A63 is now the B1231. Access to the village is from the new grade separated junction that was fully completed in early 2007.

The village is served by Ferriby railway station which is on the Selby Line. To get to places further away users must change at another railway station, the most commonly used is Brough to the west.

The Yorkshire Wolds Way National Trail and the Trans Pennine Trail long distance footpaths pass through the village.

Notable people
 Callum Scott – Singer, songwriter and finalist of Britain's Got Talent
 Phil Brown – football manager
 Alex Deakin – weather forecaster
 Zara Holland, Miss Great Britain and reality TV contestant
 Xander Parish – former dancer with the Royal Ballet, currently dancing with the Mariinsky Ballet
 Andy Pemberton – X Factor contestant
 William Wilberforce – anti-slavery campaigner
 George Witty – New Zealand MP
 Gerard Usflete (died 1406)
 Paria Farzaneh – fashion designer

References

External links

 North Ferriby Parish Council website

 All Saints' Church
 Primary school
 A vision of Britain through time
 

Villages in the East Riding of Yorkshire
Civil parishes in the East Riding of Yorkshire